The Descalabrado River is a river of Santa Isabel, Puerto Rico. It also goes through parts of Juana Díaz, and Coamo.

Poecilia sphenops, Guppy, and Awaous banana are some of the fish found in Descalabrado River.

See also
List of rivers of Puerto Rico

References

External links
 USGS Hydrologic Unit Map – Caribbean Region (1974)

Rivers of Puerto Rico